The Pirita is a  long river in northern Estonia that drains into Tallinn Bay (part of the Gulf of Finland) in Pirita, Tallinn. The basin area of the Pirita is 799 km2.

For the 1980 Summer Olympics held in Moscow, the estuary to the Gulf of Finland at Tallinn Bay hosted the sailing events.

As part of the Tallinn water supply system, the Pirita is impounded into the Paunküla and Vaskjala Reservoirs. The reservoir in Vaskjala is connected over a canal to the Lake Ülemiste in Tallinn, where the Ülemiste Water Treatment Plant is situated. Additional water is directed to Pirita from the Jägala, Soodla and Pärnu rivers through a canal network that joins Pirita in Veskitaguse.

References

Venues of the 1980 Summer Olympics
Pirita
Landforms of Harju County
Landforms of Järva County
Landforms of Tallinn